Seitsemäs sinetti (2003) is an album by the Finnish rock group Absoluuttinen Nollapiste.

Track listing
 "Kerro ketä ajattelit" (Tommi Liimatta, Aki Lääkkölä) – 4:43
 "Viikon perehtymisjakso" (Liimatta, Lääkkölä, Tomi Krutsin) – 4:07
 "Täytyy muistaa (tapaus Foliosurmat)" (Liimatta, Lääkkölä, Krutsin) – 4:09
 "Tyynyn kääntöpuoli" (Aake Otsala) – 4:06
 "Parta" (Otsala, Krutsin, Liimatta, Janne Hast) – 1:42
 "Jarrutan" (Liimatta, Lääkkölä) – 4:57
 "Käsitys lastenlapsista" (Liimatta, Krutsin) – 2:08
 "Mustaa ei ole" (Liimatta, Lääkkölä) – 6:14
 "Kultainen leikkaus" (Liimatta, Lääkkölä) – 5:42
 "Nummirock" (Liimatta, Lääkkölä, Krutsin) – 4:09
 "Sinetti" (Lääkkölä, Liimatta) – 5:00

Personnel

 Tommi Liimatta – vocals
 Aki Lääkkölä – guitar
 Aake Otsala – bass guitar, vocals
 Tomi Krutsin – drums, percussion, vocals
 Janne Hast – keyboards
 Anna Ranki – vocals (1, 3, 11)
 Mikko Kuisma – violin (7, 10)

External links
  Album entry at band's official website

Absoluuttinen Nollapiste albums
2003 albums